West Kildonan Collegiate (WKC) is a high school in Winnipeg, Manitoba. It is part of the Seven Oaks School Division, and houses about 850 students.

The school decided in June 2007 to change the school's name from "West Kildonan Collegiate Institute" to simply "West Kildonan Collegiate". The students of West Kildonan moved into its new school building in March 2008. The new school is located in a new subdivision called River Ridge, which is near the sub-divisions of Rivergrove and Riverbend. The new school is located at 101 Ridgecrest Avenue, off Main Street.

Notable alumni
 Randy Bachman, musician
 Adam Brooks, professional ice hockey player
 Cody Glass, professional ice hockey player
 Desiree Scott, professional soccer player

See also
Seven Oaks School Division

References

External links
 Seven Oaks School Division
 West Kildonan Collegiate
 Ècole Seven Oaks Middle School

High schools in Winnipeg
Educational institutions in Canada with year of establishment missing

Seven Oaks, Winnipeg